D.Z. Akin's Delicatessen is a New York-style Jewish deli and restaurant located in San Diego, California. The restaurant was open in 1980 by Zvika and Debbie Akin.

Ratings
DZ Akin's has been highly rated and described as "the restaurant that ate San Diego." San Diego Magazine and San Diego Daily Beat considered Akin's the city's best deli.

See also

 List of Ashkenazi Jewish restaurants
 List of delicatessens

References

External links
 

1980 establishments in California
Ashkenazi Jewish restaurants
Ashkenazi Jewish culture in California
Jewish delicatessens in the United States
Jews and Judaism in San Diego
Restaurants in San Diego
Restaurants established in 1980